At its peak in 1982, nuclear power in the Soviet Union accounted for 6.5% of total electricity consumption and the total nuclear capacity installed was 18 GW. However, nuclear power within the Soviet Union declined severely as a result of the 1986 Chernobyl Disaster.

History 

The first nuclear power plant constructed in the world was the Obninsk Nuclear Power Plant, built near Moscow on June 26, 1954. It was intended as an experiment to determine the capabilities of nuclear power in supplying a commercial grid. At the beginning of its operation, it produced 5 MWe. The power plant proved successful in its experiment and four years later, the Siberian Nuclear Power Station with a 100 MWe capacity was installed and subsequently increased to 600 MWe. Following the development, commercial power stations were constructed in Beloyarsk, Novo-Voronezh, Kola, Leningrad, and Armenia.

In the year 1960, the Soviet Union had a nuclear power capacity of 605 MWe. By 1975, this capacity was increased to 4.7 GW. At this point, the Soviet Union was committed to developing an aggressive nuclear power program. Throughout the 1970s, approximately 10% of electricity powering the Soviet Union came from Nuclear Power Plants and predictions made by Deputy Minister of Power Energy aimed an increase by approximately 400-500% by the year 2000.

All Soviet power reactors were designed by the Ministry of Medium Machine Building (Sredmash), the key Soviet ministry for administering the Soviet nuclear weapons complex from 1953 until 1989 (when it was reorganized into the Ministry of Atomic Energy and Industry of the USSR). The reactors were ordered and administered, however by the Ministry of Energy and Electrification (Minenergo), which was in charge of power production and plant operation. The differences in institutional culture, priorities, and expertise between these two industries have been argued to be core to understanding the choices made by the Soviet Union in the field of nuclear power, notably in its embrace of the controversial RBMK reactor design, which was developed with a priority on ease of local construction, economical value, and the possibility (never implemented) for dual-use plutonium production — with core safety concerns being either de-prioritized or kept secret.

Chernobyl accident of April 26, 1986 

On April 26, 1986 an uncontrolled power increase occurred within the core of Reactor No. 4 at the Chernobyl Nuclear Power Plant causing an explosion within the core that destroyed the reactor itself, and vented radioactive materials into the atmosphere and surrounding environment, causing dozens of immediate deaths related to the containment of the accident, and potentially tens of thousands of later deaths from cancer. The Chernobyl disaster is one of two disasters ranked as a Level 7 on the International Nuclear Event Scale for the spread of radioactive material and environmental effects, and there are significant areas of Ukraine and Belarus that are still considered contaminated by the accident.

Following the 1986 accident, stances on nuclear power changed, especially so in the USSR. The incident highlighted the threat of the country's 24 RBMK reactors, which were found to have been created with major operational flaws that cause uncontrollable spikes in energy during a reactor's emergency shutdown procedure. These required re-design or replacement to meet safety standards for operation. 

The event slowed the nuclear energy program of the Soviet Union, which would not see reinvigoration until after the collapse of the Soviet Union in 1991.

List of Reactors

See also
 Energy policy of the Soviet Union
 Nuclear energy in Armenia
 Belarusian nuclear power plant
 Nuclear energy in Kazakhstan
 Nuclear energy in Lithuania
 Nuclear power in Russia
 Nuclear power in Ukraine

References